Shchekino or Shchyokino is the name of several inhabited localities in Russia.

Kursk Oblast
Shchekino, Kursk Oblast, a selo in Shchekinsky Selsoviet of Rylsky District

Moscow Oblast
Shchekino, Moscow Oblast, a village in Nudolskoye Rural Settlement of Klinsky District

Nizhny Novgorod Oblast
Shchekino, Nizhny Novgorod Oblast, a village in Nikolo-Pogostinsky Selsoviet of Gorodetsky District

Perm Krai
Shchekino, Perm Krai, a selo in Usolsky District

Smolensk Oblast
Shchekino, Gagarinsky District, Smolensk Oblast, a village in Pokrovskoye Rural Settlement of Gagarinsky District
Shchekino, Ugransky District, Smolensk Oblast, a village in Zakharyevskoye Rural Settlement of Ugransky District
Shchekino, Yartsevsky District, Smolensk Oblast, a village under the administrative jurisdiction of Yartsevskoye Urban Settlement of Yartsevsky District

Tula Oblast
Shchekino, a town in Shchyokinsky District
Shchekino (rural locality), Tula Oblast, a village in Shevelevskaya Rural Administration of Shchyokinsky District

Tver Oblast
Shchekino, Molokovsky District, Tver Oblast, a village in Deledinskoye Rural Settlement of Molokovsky District
Shchekino, Torzhoksky District, Tver Oblast, a village in Maryinskoye Rural Settlement of Torzhoksky District

Vladimir Oblast
Shchekino, Kameshkovsky District, Vladimir Oblast, a village in Kameshkovsky District
Shchekino, Vyaznikovsky District, Vladimir Oblast, a village in Vyaznikovsky District

Vologda Oblast
Shchekino, Velikoustyugsky District, Vologda Oblast, a village in Tregubovsky Selsoviet of Velikoustyugsky District
Shchekino, Verkhovazhsky District, Vologda Oblast, a village in Chushevitsky Selsoviet of Verkhovazhsky District
Shchekino, Vologodsky District, Vologda Oblast, a village in Podlesny Selsoviet of Vologodsky District
Shchekino, Vytegorsky District, Vologda Oblast, a village in Tudozersky Selsoviet of Vytegorsky District